The 2022 CPL–U Sports Draft was the fourth annual CPL–U Sports Draft. Eight Canadian Premier League (CPL) teams selected 16 eligible U Sports soccer players in total, when the draft was held on January 20, 2022.

Format
Players can be selected if they have one to four years of U Sports eligibility remaining and have declared for the draft by December 1, 2021. On January 13, 2022, the league announced the list of 165 players who would be eligible for selection.

Each CPL team made two selections in the draft. The selection order is the reverse of the previous season's standings, including playoffs and final standings.

Player selection

Round 1

Round 2

Source:

Selection statistics

Draftees by nationality

Draftees by university

References

2022 Canadian Premier League
2022
January 2022 sports events in Canada
2022 in Canadian soccer